s-Heerenhoek is a village in the Dutch province of Zeeland. It is a part of the municipality of Borsele, and lies about 12 km east of Middelburg.

History 
The village was first mentioned around 1750 as 'S Heerenhoek, and "means corner of the lord". It is located in the north-eastern corner of the Borsselepolder which was poldered in 1616. The lords refers to the lord of Schenge Castle in 's-Heer-Arendskerke. 's-Heerenhoek developed after 1616 in a grid structure. In 1669, the village was devastated by fire and a new church was built in 1672.

The Dutch Reformed church from 1672 was moved to Netherlands Open Air Museum in Arnhem between 1987 and 1988. The village developed into a Catholic area from the 1760s onwards. The Catholic St Willibrordus Church was built between 1873 and 1874 in Gothic Revival style and has a tall tower.

's-Heerenhoek was home to 772 people in 1840. The municipal council used to meet in the local inn. In 1881, it was outlawed to hold meetings in a locality which served alcohol. The problem was solved by separating a part of the inn and building its own front door. In 1892, a town hall was built.

's-Heerenhoek  was a separate municipality until 1970 when it was merged into Borsele.

Gallery

References

Former municipalities of Zeeland
Populated places in Zeeland
Borsele